Peter Bothwell (born 28 September 1995) is a former Northern Irish tennis player who represented Ireland.

Bothwell has a career high ATP singles ranking of World No. 602 achieved on 5 August 2019. Also, Bothwell has a career high ATP doubles ranking of World No. 447 achieved on 17 September 2018.

Bothwell has reached two singles finals in his career, with a record of 1 win an 1 loss, winning the title at the Spain F38 Futures tournament in November 2018. Additionally, he has reached 17 career doubles finals with a record of 8 wins and 9 losses. All of his combined 19 final appearances have been at the ITF Futures level.

Bothwell has represented Ireland at the Davis Cup, where he has a W/L record of 7–5.

ATP Challenger and ITF Futures finals

Singles: 2 (1–1)

Doubles: 17 (8–9)

External links

1995 births
Living people
Irish male tennis players
People from Hillsborough, County Down
Tennis players from Northern Ireland